West Lampung Regency is a regency of Lampung Province, Sumatra, Indonesia. Until 2012 it had an area of 4,950.4 km2 of which forests occupied some 57% of the total area (as of 2011). It had a population of 418,560 people at the 2010 census. However, on 25 October 2012 the southwestern part of this area was separated from West Lampung Regency to form the new Pesisir Barat Regency (with its administrative centre at the town of Krui). 

The residual Lampung Barat Regency now covers an area of 2,116.59 km2 and this area had a population of 277,296 at the 2010 census and 302,139 at the 2020 census; the official estimate as at mid 2021 was 302,750. The regency seat is at the town of Liwa.

Administrative Districts 
West Lampung Regency consisted until 2012 of seventeen districts (kecamatan), but the southwestern eight districts were split off in 2012 to form the new Pesisir Barat (West Coast) Regency. Since that removal, six new districts have been created within the residual area of the regency, by splitting existing districts. The areas and populations of the resulting fifteen districts at the 2010 census and the 2020 census, together with the official estimates for mid 2021, are tabulated below. The districts are subdivided into 131 villages (rural desa and urban kelurahan), each administered by a lurah.

Note: (a) new district created since 2012; its 2010 census population is included in the figure for the existing district(s) from which it was cut out.

History
The history of the Dutch colonial era, during the period of Prince Alif Jaya around 1786, built a large guesthouse in Liwa. In 1899, the Sultan of Merah Dani from the holy land, after returning from the pilgrimage, visited Constantinople, Instantbul. Prince Dalom Merah Dani told the Ottoman Sultan that he was from an Islamic Kingdom. Sumatra, whose ancestors came from the northern coastal land of Sumatra, then the Prince was received by the Ottoman Sultan, the Prince was awarded with a Kiswah.

West Lampung Regency was formed from the division of North Lampung Regency based on Law no. 6 of 1991. The district, which is also known as a cold area, has its capital in Liwa.
Prior to the status of a definitive area, West Lampung was a sub-district of the regent of North Lampung with the capital city of Liwa.
The Governor of Dati I Lampung, Poedjono Pranyoto, to help fight for it at the central level. And thanks to this struggle, the central government finally prepared a bill regarding the establishment of the West Lampung District Dati II.
Support was also given by the Regent of North Lampung. By contributing his suggestions to the Lampung Level I Regional Government regarding the candidate for the capital city of West Lampung, which was stated in letter No. PU.000/1232/Bank.LU/1978.
The Minister of Home Affairs (Mendagri) which is held by Rudini issued the Instruction of the Minister of Home Affairs No. 17 of 1991, which contains the Instructions for the Implementation of Law No. 6 of 1991. This law contains the establishment of the District Level II West Lampung.

Inauguration of the establishment of West Lampung Regency and at the same time inaugurating the Acting Head of the Level II Regional Head of West Lampung, namely Hakim Saleh Umpu Singa on September 24, 1991. The Minister of Home Affairs of the Republic of Indonesia Rudini received the Customary Coat of Honor from Prince Edward Syah Pernong, since 2012 based on the Law of the Republic of Indonesia Number 22 of 2012 concerning the Establishment of the Pesisir Barat Regency in Lampung Province (State Gazette of the Republic of Indonesia of 2012 Number 231 Supplement to the State Gazette Number 5364), Prior to the birth of the Pesisir Barat Regency based on the above Act, the Pesisir Barat Regency was still included in the administrative area of ​​the Regency of West Lampung. whose district capital is Liwa.

Gallery

Reference

 
Regencies of Lampung